Washington Terrace, is a city in Weber County, Utah, United States. The population was 9,067 at the 2010 census. It is part of the Ogden–Clearfield, Utah Metropolitan Statistical Area.

Washington Terrace had its foundings when it was developed in 1948 from a war time housing project. George Herman Van Leeuwen was instrumental in securing the land from the federal government and acted as the President of the Board of Directors. Due to his role in the organizing of the community, it was proposed to be named VanLeeuwenville, which was voted down for a variety of reasons.

Geography
According to the United States Census Bureau, the city has a total area of 1.9 square miles (4.9 km2), all land.

Demographics

As of the census of 2000, there were 8,551 people, 3,019 households, and 2,267 families residing in the city. The population density was 4,477.4 people per square mile (1,728.6/km2). There were 3,162 housing units at an average density of 1,655.7 per square mile (639.2/km2). The racial makeup of the city was 89.43% White, 2.25% African American, 0.57% Native American, 1.19% Asian, 0.35% Pacific Islander, 3.93% from other races, and 2.28% from two or more races. Hispanic or Latino of any race were 7.88% of the population.

There were 3,019 households, out of which 36.0% had children under the age of 18 living with them, 56.7% were married couples living together, 13.4% had a female householder with no husband present, and 24.9% were non-families. 20.9% of all households were made up of individuals, and 10.1% had someone living alone who was 65 years of age or older. The average household size was 2.77 and the average family size was 3.21.

In the city, the population was spread out, with 27.9% under the age of 18, 13.7% from 18 to 24, 24.9% from 25 to 44, 18.3% from 45 to 64, and 15.2% who were 65 years of age or older. The median age was 31 years. For every 100 females, there were 95.7 males. For every 100 females age 18 and over, there were 89.0 males.

The median income for a household in the city was $42,243, and the median income for a family was $47,332. Males had a median income of $35,938 versus $26,406 for females. The per capita income for the city was $17,240. About 5.5% of families and 7.9% of the population were below the poverty line, including 10.5% of those under age 18 and 3.4% of those age 65 or over.

Historical events 
The second to last person in America to be executed by firing squad, John Albert Taylor, raped and murdered Charla King in Washington Terrace in 1988.

Mayor Mark Allen was chosen by a dice roll when the 2003 election ended in a tie.

On September 22, 2016, an EF1 tornado struck the city at approximately 3:30 PM MDT, part of a line of storms that caused moderate damage throughout the Salt Lake City metropolitan area. One person sustained an injury from the tornado.

Education
Washington Terrace is home to four public schools: Bonneville High School, T.H. Bell Jr. High School, Roosevelt Elementary, and Washington Terrace Elementary.

References

External links
 City of Washington Terrace

Cities in Utah
Cities in Weber County, Utah
Ogden–Clearfield metropolitan area
Populated places established in 1948